Eastern Niagara Hospital is the name created to cover a pair of hospitals founded in the early 1900s in Lockport and Newfane, New York that each operated independently. Under cost pressures they were both operated under the Eastern Niagara Health System (ENHS) umbrella. ENHS also operates a nursing home.  In 2019 The New York Times portrayed Eastern as among the least likely to overcharge, yet they were facing cost pressures.

Lockport Memorial Hospital 

The Lockport City Hospital opened on July 1, 1908 as an 18-bed medical facility.  It was renamed Lockport Memorial Hospital in 1959.  In 1999, the Lockport Memorial Hospital and the Newfane Inter-Community Memorial Hospital took on a legal affiliation under the name Eastern Niagara Hospital.  By 2009 the new names Eastern Niagara Health System and Eastern Niagara Hospital were being used. Lockport was known as Eastern Niagara Hospital/Lockport Division; the other location was known as the Newfane Division.

In 1999, it was described by The New York Times as "struggling,"

Catholic Health broke ground for a new hospital in 2021 in collaboration with Eastern Hospital System.

 Services 

The Lockport hospital provides the following services:  radiology, surgical, cardiac, respiratory therapy, emergency services, acute & intensive care, chemical dependency treatment, occupational medicine, DOT medical exams, laboratory, and express care.

 Newfane Division 

The Eastern Niagara Hospital/Newfane Division was previously known as Inter-Community Memorial Hospital''.  In 2019 this facility was closed as part of filing for bankruptcy protection, although another hospital indicated at the time that they'd take it over.

References 

Hospitals in New York (state)